The 1987 Australian Open was a tennis tournament played on grass courts at the Kooyong Stadium in Melbourne in Victoria in Australia. It was the 75th edition of the Australian Open and was held from 12 through 25 January 1987; the first tournament to be held after New Year's Day since the late 1960s and also the last tournament to be played on grass before the change of surface.

Change of schedule
After the event did not hold a schedule in 1986 due to the Open changing dates from December to January. This allowed it to count as a Grand Prix event after the movement of the Grand Prix Masters from March to early December. As such, this edition of Australian Open was held.

Seniors

Men's singles

 Stefan Edberg defeated  Pat Cash 6–3, 6–4, 3–6, 5–7, 6–3
 It was Edberg's 2nd career Grand Slam title and his 2nd Australian Open title.

Women's singles

 Hana Mandlíková defeated  Martina Navratilova 7–5, 7–6(7–1)
 It was Mandlíková's 4th career Grand Slam title and her 2nd and last Australian Open title.

Men's doubles

 Stefan Edberg /  Anders Järryd defeated  Peter Doohan /  Laurie Warder 6–4, 6–4, 7–6(7–3)
 It was Edberg's 3rd career Grand Slam title and his 3rd Australian Open title. It was Järryd's 2nd career Grand Slam title and his only Australian Open title.

Women's doubles

 Martina Navratilova /  Pam Shriver defeated  Zina Garrison /  Lori McNeil 6–1, 6–0
 It was Navratilova's 43rd career Grand Slam title and her 9th Australian Open title. It was Shriver's 15th career Grand Slam title and her 6th Australian Open title.

Mixed doubles

 Zina Garrison /  Sherwood Stewart defeated  Anne Hobbs /  Andrew Castle 3–6, 7–6(7–5), 6–3 
 It was Garrison's 1st career Grand Slam title and her only Australian Open title. It was Stewart's 4th career Grand Slam title and his 2nd and last Australian Open title.

Juniors

Boys' singles

 Jason Stoltenberg defeated  Todd Woodbridge 6–2, 7–6

Girls' singles

 Michelle Jaggard defeated  Nicole Provis 6–2, 6–4

Boys' doubles

 Jason Stoltenberg /  Todd Woodbridge defeated  Shane Barr /  Bryan Roe 6–2, 6–4

Girls' doubles

 Ann Devries /  Nicole Provis defeated  Genevieve Dwyer /  Danielle Jones 6–3, 6–1

Prize money

Total prize money for the event was A$1,372,375.

References

External links
 Official website Australian Open

 
 

 
1987 in Australian tennis
January 1987 sports events in Australia
1987,Australian Open